The Guthries were a Canadian country rock band based in Halifax, Nova Scotia. They released two albums in the early 2000s.

History
The Guthries formed in 1998 in Halifax. Originally formed by vocalist Ruth Minnikin and Dale Murray, the band included their respective siblings Gabe Minnikin and Brian Murray, as well as high school friends Serge Samson and Matt Mays. Early line-ups included Nick Bevan-John (Hotel Faces, Jack MacDonald, Ceti Alpha) and Tim-Jim Baker (Matt Mays and El Torpedo).

The band's first album was Off Windmill, released in 2000.  Mays subsequently left the band in 2002, just prior to the release of the band's second release, the self-titled The Guthries. The band toured extensively throughout Canada and the UK.  Following that album, however, the band members each began pursuing solo projects, and have not released another Guthries album.

Members
Ruth Minnikin (vocals, accordion, acoustic guitar, piano, organ)
Dale Murray (vocals, lead guitar, pedal steel)
Gabe Minnikin (vocals, guitar, accordion, mandolin, organ, piano)
Brian Murray (drums, banjo)
Serge Samson (bass, mandolin)
Matt Mays (vocals, acoustic/lead guitar)

Discography
2000:  Off Windmill
2002:  The Guthries

Awards and nominations

References

External links
The Guthries at ChartAttack

Musical groups established in 1998
Musical groups disestablished in 2002
Musical groups from Halifax, Nova Scotia
Canadian country rock groups
1998 establishments in Nova Scotia
2002 disestablishments in Canada